The following is a list of the 65 music videos of the Schoolhouse Rock! series.

Series overview

Music videos

Multiplication Rock, Season 1 (1973)

Grammar Rock, Season 2 (1973–74, 1976, 1993)

America Rock, Season 3 (1975–76, 1979, 2002)

Science Rock, Season 4 (1978–79)

Computer Rock, Season 5 (1982–84)

Money Rock, Season 6 (1994–96) 
In the 1990s, ABC produced more new episodes along with the last two of Grammar Rock.

Earth Rock, Season 7 (2009)
Like the two newly-produced "America Rock" music video were released in 2002, none of the "Earth Rock" music videos were aired on television. This (last) season was released direct-to-video. Between songs 8 and 9, "The Energy Blues" is featured.

References

External links
 

Lists of American children's animated television series episodes
Lists of Disney television series episodes
Episodes